Risky Romance is a South Korean television series starring Ji Hyun-woo, Lee Si-young, Kim Jin-yeop and Yoon Joo-hee. It aired on MBC from July 23 to September 17, 2018 on Mondays and Tuesdays at 22:00 (KST) time slot.

Synopsis
The romance story of an excellent neurosurgeon and a determined endocrinologist. Han Seung-joo (Ji Hyun-woo) used to be a warm and an understanding person, but after the death of a close friend, he became a hot-headed person and merciless towards others. After listening to the rumors of how Seung-joo has turned into a completely different person, Joo In-ah (Lee Si-young) can't help but feel intrigued towards him, believing that all of that temper is because of hormones. She is determined to make him as her patient, and run a blood test on him to check on his hormone levels. From then, their rivalry begins.

Cast

Main
 Ji Hyun-woo as Han Seung-joo
 A talented neurosurgeon with an extraordinary memory and a logical approach to things. However, his feisty personality and competitiveness makes him unstoppable when he fixates on something.
 Lee Si-young as Joo In-ah
A hormone-obsessed woman who believes that life is controlled entirely by them. 
 Kim Jin-yeop as Cha Jae-hwan
Son of the hospital director. A neurosurgeon with talent, wealth and looks. 
 Yoon Joo-hee as Joo Se-ra
Joo In-ah's stepsister. A TV announcer who is pursuing Cha Jae-hwan.

Supporting
 Sunwoo Sun as Jang Ji-yeon
 Jang Se-hyun as Jung Hyun-woo
 Choi Ryung as Yoo Sang-bum
 Bae Seul-ki as Lee Jin-kyung
 Shin Won-ho as Choi Jae-seung 
 In A as Lee Mi-woon 
 Jeon No-min as Cha Jung-tae 
 Cha Jae-hwan's father, who is the head of the same hospital Joo In-ah and Han Seung-joo are working for.
 Choi Sung-min as Min-ki
 Park Han-sol as Jang Han-ah
 Son Jong-bum as Park Il-won

Production
The first script reading took place on May 3, 2018 at MBC Broadcasting Station in Sangam, South Korea.
 The drama reunites Ji Hyun-woo with Lee Si-young who previously starred together in Becoming a Billionaire. 
 Lee Yo-won was offered the female lead but declined.
 When the series was still in development at MBC, it had the working title Emotional Technology/Technology of Emotions.

Original soundtrack

Part 1

Part 2

Part 3

Part 4

Part 5

Part 6

Part 7

Part 8

Part 9

Ratings
 In the table below,  represent the lowest ratings and  represent the highest ratings.
 NR denotes that the drama did not rank in the top 20 daily programs on that date.
 N/A denotes that the rating is not known.

Episodes 17 & 18 did not air on August 20 due to coverage of the 2018 Asian Games.
Episodes 19 & 20 did not air on August 27 due to coverage of the 2018 Asian Games.

Awards and nominations

Notes

References

External links
  
 

MBC TV television dramas
2018 South Korean television series debuts
2018 South Korean television series endings
Korean-language television shows
South Korean medical television series
South Korean romance television series